"I Have Loved You Girl (But Not Like This Before)" is a song written and recorded by American country music artist Earl Thomas Conley. He first released the song in 1975 on the GRT label as Earl Conley, reaching number 87 on the Hot Country Songs chart.

In January 1983, Conley re-released the song as the third from his album Somewhere Between Right and Wrong. The re-recording went to number two on the same chart that year.

Critical reception
Kip Kirby of Billboard magazine reviewed the song favorably, calling it one of the brightest songs on the album. He went on to say that Conley combines "an excellent melody, expressive vocals and sensitive lyrics for a fresh way of presenting a love song." He states that the "lean guitar/piano rhythms leave proper space for Conley's singing."

Charts

Weekly charts

Year-end charts

References

1983 singles
1975 songs
Earl Thomas Conley songs
Songs written by Earl Thomas Conley
RCA Records singles